Field handball was a demonstration sport at the 1952 Summer Olympics.

A single match between the men's teams of Sweden and Denmark was held, which Sweden won by nineteen goals to eleven.

Match

The match was played in rainy conditions.

Players
All participants were awarded a commemorative medal.

Sweden
Rune Nilsson (GK)
Rolf Zachrisson
Sven Schönberger
Åke Norén
Hans Olsson
Lars Olsson
Olle Juthage
Sten Åkerstedt
Stig Nilsson
Evert Sjunnesson
Rune Lindqvist

Denmark
Skjold Bjørn (GK)
Gustav Volder
Poul Winge
Jørgen Larsen
Erik Christensen
Viggo Larsen
Jørn Tillegreen
Mogens Nielsen
Svend Aage Madsen
Poul Rask
Erik Eigaard

References

1952
1952 in handball
1952 Summer Olympics events
Olympic demonstration sports
Men's events at the 1952 Summer Olympics